Aktio–Vonitsa is a municipality in the Aetolia-Acarnania regional unit of the West Greece region of Greece. Its seat is the town of Vonitsa. The municipality has an area of 660.172 km2.

Municipality
The municipality Aktio–Vonitsa was formed at the 2011 local government reform by the merger of the following 3 former municipalities, that became municipal units:
Anaktorio
Palairos (Kekropia)
Medeon

References

Municipalities of Western Greece
Populated places in Aetolia-Acarnania